The Women's 5 km Classic competition of the Vancouver 2010 Paralympics is held at Whistler Olympic Park in Whistler, British Columbia. The competition is scheduled for Thursday, March 18.

Visually Impaired
In the cross-country skiing 5 km Classic visually impaired, the athlete with a visual impairment has a sighted guide. The two skiers are considered a team, and dual medals are awarded.

Sitting

Standing

References

External links
2010 Winter Paralympics schedule and results , at the official website of the 2010 Winter Paralympics in Vancouver

Women's 5 km Classic
Para